Karen Elizabeth Cromie (24 September 1979 – 28 January 2011) was a Northern Irish rower, wheelchair basketball player and Paralympian. She competed at the 2008 Summer Paralympics in Beijing, where she in came fifth in the mixed double sculls, with James Roberts.

Career 
Cromie won silver at the 2005 and 2006 Paralympic Wheelchair Basketball World Cups with the National GB Team. In 2009, she transferred to the National Irish Team.

Family 
Karen's sister is a doctor in the United Kingdom, and her brother is a chiropractor in Norway.

Death 
Cromie died by suicide on 28 January 2011. She was 31.

References

External links
 
 
 
 
 Karen Cromie at PassedAway.com

1979 births
2011 deaths
British female rowers
Paralympic rowers of Great Britain
Rowers at the 2008 Summer Paralympics
2011 suicides
Suicides by jumping in Northern Ireland